Richard Franz Stöhr (11 June 1874 – 11 December 1967) was an Austrian composer, music author and teacher.

Born in Vienna, Stöhr studied composition with Robert Fuchs at the Vienna Conservatory. After working there as a repetiteur and choral instructor from 1900, he taught music (theory of harmony, counterpoint, form) from 1903 to 1938, being professor from 1915. Among his students were Herbert von Karajan, Rudolf Serkin, Erich Leinsdorf, Samuel Barber, Erich Zeisl, Louis Horst, Marlene Dietrich, Alois Hába, Hellmut Federhofer, and Mimi Wagensonner. Fired from the Vienna Conservatory due to his Jewish heritage in 1938, he emigrated to the US in 1939 and taught at the Curtis Institute of Music in Philadelphia. His students there included Leonard Bernstein and Eugene Bossart.  From 1941 to 1950 he taught at St. Michael's College in Vermont, where he maintained emeritus status until 1960. He died in Montpelier, Vermont in the United States.

Biography

Early life

Richard Stöhr was born in Vienna, in the same year as Arnold Schoenberg. His Jewish parents had come from Hungary. His father, Samuel Stern, was a professor of medicine at the University of Vienna. His mother, Mathilde, was a member of the Porges family (her brother was Heinrich Porges, a close associate of Richard Wagner). Stöhr had one sibling, a sister named Hedwig (birth date unknown) who would later perish in Modliborzyce in the custody of the Nazis on January 2, 1942.

Study in Vienna
He began composing at the age of six and kept a daily diary from the age of 15. Stöhr first obtained an M.D. degree (1898) but immediately entered the Vienna Academy of Music as a composition student of Robert Fuchs. At this time he also changed his name from Stern to Stöhr and converted to Christianity. In the annual summary of his diary from 1898 he wrote:

This was the year the big change occurred. Herewith I have sealed the fate of my future life. Now I am a musician and I carry this responsibility seriously, consciously and without regret. At the same time came the actual change of my name to "Stöhr", on which I had decided already in the summer. It was just the right time for this and I am glad I didn't miss it. I am certain that in the future advantages will come from this for me.

He was also encouraged in his musical activities by Heinrich Porges, who helped him get around in Viennese musical circles, and who introduced him to Gustav Mahler, among others.

Career in Austria
After completing his studies with Fuchs and earning a PhD in music (1903) he first worked at the Academy as a rehearsal pianist and choir director. Soon he was teaching courses in theory, composition and the history of music, and coaching chamber music. When Fuchs retired in 1911, Stöhr took over his most advanced courses and he became a professor of music theory at the Academy in 1915. That same year he was called up to serve as a doctor by the Austrian army. He served in a hospital in the suburbs of Vienna and was able to live at home and continue teaching at the Academy. The length of his service is unknown. The extent of his success as an author and composer is summed up the diary summary of 1909: "Of even greater importance for me was the success of my "Harmonielehre", of which the first edition was already sold out in June and has therefore already appeared in the second edition. The critiques of this work were extremely positive from all sides. The performances of my compositions reached such frequency this season that some newspapers even commented that this was inappropriate."

Stöhr was married to his first wife in 1904, a marriage which lasted only three years. In 1909 he met his second wife Marie (Mitzi). As he was unable to obtain a divorce from his first wife, Richard and Marie lived together from 1909 until 1923, when they were finally able to marry. Their children Richard and Hedwig (Hedi) were born in the 1920s. In this decade he solidified his status as a leading musical theorist and also published treatises and textbooks on counterpoint and musical form. He also performed frequently as a pianist and he was able to have virtually all of his compositions published. Before his exile there were hundreds of performances of his works annually in Europe.

Around 1930, Austria's dismal economy and growing antisemitism prompted Stöhr to begin learning English. It is unknown exactly why, though it may have been part of a plan to emigrate, or simply as preparation in case he had to emigrate. A candid picture of Stöhr's life in the 1920s comes from the following reminiscence by a former student, Hedy Kempny, written in 1954 on the occasion of Stöhr's 80th birthday:

During the 1920s I was a student of Dr. Richard Stöhr at the Academy of Music in Vienna. He was my teacher of History of Music and Harmony. All of us women students were very fond of him. Not only was he a very handsome man, but we also found his teaching fascinating. Soon we followed him wherever he went; to concerts or when he was invited into private homes, where musicians dared to make us acquainted with a new kind of music by composers such as Richard Strauss, Gustav Mahler, Arnold Schoenberg, Alban Berg, Eric Korngold and many others. Stöhr was still Conservative, but open minded about the new era, which soon hypnotized us. We followed with enthusiasm.

At the end of World War One many Viennese young people, including myself, were stricken with tuberculosis. This was no wonder after the starvation and hardship during the war and inflation. But Stöhr had plans for helping us. He had connections through former students in Switzerland and Norway. He wrote personal letters to each of them begging them to invite us to their countries in order to help us recuperate and to feed us so we would lose the "string bean" look. He suggested in his letters that we would bring along the renowned Viennese charm, the love of music and an optimistic outlook in spite of all the misery we had experienced. The effort was a tremendous success, and I believe that our benefactors were not disappointed to have invited us.

Stöhr lived in a typical "old Vienna" home with two pianos in the huge music room. On the walls, there were photos of composers and famous people he knew in various countries, as well as snapshots of students and friends. Every two weeks he had an "open house" to which anyone who wanted to come was invited. We would gather at about seven o'clock and bring along friends who wanted to meet Dr. Stöhr. It was quite informal, and sometimes he came later and found the apartment crowded by thirty or more people. Many of us brought food such as cheese, sausages, salads, fruit or cakes. We deposited these in the kitchen and after a short time, we gathered in the living room, where all the goodies were displayed on the table and we helped ourselves.

But soon Stöhr got up and went to the music room and sat at the piano. He called out "Pifferl", his pet name for his wife Mitzi, and she came quickly and stood behind him and massaged his head while he played. Indeed this was strange, but we knew of this eccentric behavior of his and nobody minded. He had other strange habits. For instance, when he was invited to someone's house he brought out of a pocket a folding coathanger for his coat.

Many times all kinds of famous people attended these gatherings without fanfare. For instance Bruno Walter, Felix Weingartner, Korngold and other musicians. Sometimes Stöhr's beautiful Lieder were interpreted by opera singers. Later in the evening, there were discussions, not only about music, but also about what was new and exciting in Vienna. We discussed the music of Gustav Mahler. We younger ones loved it from the beginning. There was never a concert of Mahler's music, often conducted by Bruno Walter, without a fight between us and the older generation. After a Mahler symphony, when we admirers stood up, applauded and shouted with excitement, the opponents were chased out by us and finally after many calls, Bruno Walter would come out once more. We stood close to the ramp, stretching our hands out to him - the greatest interpreter and friend of Gustav Mahler.

Stöhr talked and listened and argued. He was versed in every field and subject. The discussions were most interesting and stimulating. Stöhr's heart and mind stayed young and flexible. He gave help and advice to us younger ones who asked for it. What a wise man he was!

National socialist takeover and dismissal
After German troops marched into Austria as part of the Anschluss on 13 March [1938], an SS intelligence unit was housed in the state Academy. Over the next few days, the interim director suspended eleven teachers who, under the Nuremberg Race Laws, did not have the "right" to swear allegiance to Hitler due to their Jewish extraction. A list of cuts dated May 1938 contains the names of 23 teachers who were no longer to be employed on the grounds of their "race." Stöhr was among them. Several of the teachers were allowed to emigrate. The fate of several other teachers is unknown.

Emigration to the USA
In February 1939 Richard Stöhr emigrated to the United States. From this time until the end of his life he used the alternate spelling of his name: Stoehr. He was hired by the Curtis Institute of Music in Philadelphia, initially as music librarian and subsequently to teach courses in theory and composition. Leonard Bernstein was among his students at Curtis. Stoehr was also hired to translate part of the Burrell Collection of the Letters of Richard Wagner. Curtis downsized their faculty in 1941 due to the war and Stoehr was let go from his position there. He quickly found another position at Saint Michael's College, then in Winooski Park, now in Colchester, Vermont. There he taught German language as well as music courses. The college was not able to pay a full-time salary, so Stoehr was assisted by at least one refugee aid organization. Stoehr continued to compose prolifically during his years in the US in all major classical genres except opera. None of the numerous compositions from his US years were ever published.

Richard Stoehr died in December, 1967 in Montpelier, Vermont and is buried in Merrill Cemetery in Colchester.

Legacy
Richard Stoehr's diary spanning more than six decades is stored in the Austrian National Library along with his published compositions. Copies of most of his published compositions as well as the manuscripts of his compositions from the post-emigration years are available at the Saint Michael's College Archive. His work encompasses choral music, chamber music, seven symphonies, symphonic poems, two operas, an oratorio and two cantatas. While Schoenberg and others of the Second Viennese School were creating a new 20th Century style of composition, Stoehr seemed hardly influenced by them. Contemporary critics respected his music which maintained the tonal tradition of the 19th Century.

In 2003 the City of Vienna dedicated a plaque at the site of his former residence at Karolinengasse 14. In 2010 ORF (Austrian National Radio) released a Richard Stöhr compact disc recording (CD 3093) of his String Quartet in D minor, Opus 22 from 1903 amongst other pieces. His flute sonata is available on an David Shostac CD entitled Masterpieces Remembered. Stöhr's cello works are available on a CD released by Toccata Classics. In February 2010  his String Quartet was performed in Vancouver, Canada by the Vancouver Chamber Players for Rediscovered Treasures on the Out For Lunch concert series.

Bibliography

By Richard Stöhr (selection)
 (1906). Praktischer Leitfaden der Harmonielehre. Vienna: Universal Edition; Japanese Edition, 1954, Tokyo.
 (1911). Formenlehre der Musik. Leipzig: Kistner und Siegel.
 (1911). Praktischer Leitfaden des Kontrapunktes. Hamburg: Benjamin.
 (1915). Praktische Modulationslehre. Leipzig: Kistner und Siegel.
 (1917). Anhang zu der praktischen Modulationslehre. Leipzig: Kistner und Siegel.
 (1921). "Erfahrungen im Theorieunterricht", Musikpädagogische Zeitschrift (Wien) Xl/6.
 (1931). Fragen und Aufgaben zur Harmonielehre. Vienna: Universal Edition.
 (1954). Über den Ursprung der modernen Musik (Japanese), Tokyo.

As translator
 Richard Wagner (1950). Letters of Richard Wagner. The Burrell Collection. New York: The Macmillan Company.

About Richard Stöhr
 Hans Sittner (1965). Richard Stöhr. Mensch/Musiker/Lehrer. Vienna: Doblinger.

Musical compositions 

The following is a list of Dr. Stoehr's musical compositions, arranged by genre. In general, Opus numbers 70 and lower were assigned by Stoehr's publishers in Europe and represent items printed and sold in the sheet music trade in Europe up to 1938.  Opus numbers 71 and above were assigned by Stoehr himself and represent completed but unpublished works composed in the United States after 1938. The list has been adapted from Appendix 4 of Dr. Hans Sittner's biography of Stöhr.

Operas
 Ilse, Romantic opera in three acts, Op. 31 (Text by Richard Batka) (Universal Edition, Wien)
 Die Gurtelspanner, in three acts, Op. 59 (Text by Beatrice Dovsky) (Ms)

Oratorios
 Der verlorene Sohn, Biblical oratorio in four parts (Text by Viktoria Schotteck), Op. 14 (Ms)
 Notturno sinfonico, Cantata for choir, solos, and orchestra, Op. 67 (Ms)
 Christmas Cantata for mixed chorus, soli, orchestra, and organ on a text by Longfellow Higgins, Op. 84 (Ms)

Symphonies
 Symphony No. 1 in A minor, Op. 18 (1909)
1. Andante maestoso
2. Scherzo
3. Andante religioso
4. Finale. Vivacissimo
 Symphony No. 2 in D minor, Op. 81 (1942;Ms)
1. Allegro energico
2. Andante
3. Vivace
4. Finale. Allegro con fuoco 
 Symphony No. 3 in C, Op. 93 (1943; Ms)
1. Molto moderato
2. Andante con moto
3. Allegro con brio
4. Finale. Un poco grave — Allegro con brio 
 Symphony No. 4, An Artist's Life!, Op. 101 (1944; Ms)
 Symphony No. 5 in E minor, Op. 106 (1944; Ms)
 Symphony No. 6 in B flat, Op. 129 (1949; Ms)
 Symphony No. 7 in C minor, Op. 136 (1952; Ms)

Orchestral works
 Serenade in C minor, Op. 7 (Ms.)
 Suite for String Orchestra in C major, Op. 8 (Leuckardt, Leipzig)
 Symphonic Fantasy for organ and Orchestra in F-Moll, Op. 29 (KS)
 Chamber Symphony in F major, Op. 32
 Romantische Suite for Orchestra in D, Op. 37 (Ms)
 Symphonic Poem Vom Leben, after Schiller, Op. 51 (Ms)
 Vermont Suite'''for Orchestra, Op. 72 (Ms)
 Overture for violin, winds and percussion, per aspera ad astra, Op. 79a (Ms)
 Two Roads to Victory*  (Through Arms - Through Victory), Op. 79b (Ms)
 Second Suite for String Orchestra, Op. 120 (Ms.)
 Scherzo in F major for Orchestra, WoO (Ms)

Concertante works
 Cornet Concerto in B minor, Op. 40 (Oertel, Hannover)
 1. Allegro energico
 2. Andante con moto
 3. Finale. Allegro vivace
 Concert Fantasy for Violin and Orchestra in D minor, Op. 50 (Kistner und Siegel, Leipzig)
 Concerto in the Old Style for percussion, piano, and strings in G minor, Op. 68.
1. Intrata
2. Sarabande & Scherzo
3. Burleske & Aria
4. Introduction & Finale

Choral works
 Vier Gesänge für dreistimmigen Frauenchor mit Klavier, Op. 5 (Kistner und Siegel, Leipzig)
 Zwei Männerchöre mit Orchester, Op. 10 (Kistner und Siegel, Leipzig)
 Drei gemischte Chöre für Orchester, Op. 12
 1. Waldnacht(Kistner und Siegel, Leipzig)
 2. Weihnachtsmärchen (Leuckardt, Leipzig.
 3. Die Nacht (Ms)
 Drei Quartette fur Frauenstimmen a cappella (Ms)
 Zwei dreistimmige Frauenchöre (Callwey Verlag, Munich)
 Sechs Männerchöre, a cappella, Op. 25 (Kistner und Siegel, Leipzig)
 Zwei Männerchöre mit Orchester, Op. 30 (Kistner und Siegel, Leipzig)
 Drei gemischte Chöre mit Orchester, Op. 36 (Kistner und Siegel, Leipzig) Der Landsknecht Abendritt, Op. 38 (Mannerchor, Orgel und kl. Trommel) (Kistner und Siegel, Leipzig)
 Sechs Frauenchöre mit Klavier, Op. 39 (Kistner und Siegel, Leipzig)
 Erntefestlied (mit Orchester), Op. 42 (Kistner und Siegel, Leipzig)
 Das Klostergrab (mit Orgel), Op. 44 (Ms)
 Johannisfeier (mit Orge]. und Orchester), Op. 45 (Ms)
 Zwei Frauenchöre mit Orchester, Op. 57 (Kistner und Siegel, Leipzig)
 Zwei zweistimmige Frauenchöre mit Klavier und Laute, resp. Glockenspiele, Op. 58 (Kistner und Siegel, Leipzig)
 Allerseelen (mit Orchester oder Klavier), Op. 66 (Ms)
 Fünf Frauenchöre mit Klavier (englisch), Op. 78 (1942; Ms)
 Four mixed choruses with piano, Op, 83 (1942; Ms)
 Suite for four recorders, spinetto and chorus of female voices, Op. 111a (1944; Ms)
 Den Lichtspendern. Vierstimmiger Frauenchor (1948; Ms)
 Winter, Vierstimmiger Frauenchor (1949; Ms)
 Ballad of St. Michael's, male chorus & piano, trumpet, drums (Ms)
 A Grace for Christmas, for mixed chorus and piano (Text by J.F. Cooke; 1950)

Violin sonatas
 Violin Sonata No. 1 in C, Op. 27 (1911; Universal Edition, Wien)
 Violin Sonata No. 2 , Op. 61 (1921; Huni, Zurich)
 Violin Sonata No. 3 in E minor, Op. 73 (1941; Ms)
 Violin Sonata No. 4 in D minor, Op. 83 (1942; Ms) 
 Violin Sonata No. 5 in B, Op. 95 (1943; Ms)
 Violin Sonata No. 6 in G minor, Quasi fantasia, Op. 103  (Ms)
 Violin Sonata No. 7 in D, Op. 107 (Ms)
 Violin Sonata No. 8 in C, Op. 115 (Ms)
 Violin Sonata No. 9 in D, Op. 118 (Ms)
 Violin Sonata No. 10 in C, Op. 122 (Ms)
 Violin Sonata No. 11 in B minor, Op. 125 (Ms)
 Violin Sonata No. 12 in D minor, Op. 130 (1949; Ms)
 Violin Sonata No. 13 in A minor, Op. 131 (Ms)
 Violin Sonata No. 14 in B minor, Op. 134a  (Ms)
 Violin Sonata No. 15 in E flat, Op. 134b (Ms)

Chamber music
 Oktett für Blaser- und Streichinstrumente, Op. 2 (Ms)
 Klavierquintett G-Moll, Op. 6 (Ms)
 Trio Es-Dur für Klavier, Violin und Violoncello, Op. 16 (Kistner und Siegel, Leipzig)
 Fantasiestücke (Suite für Violoncello und Klavier, Op. 17 (Kistner und Siegel, Leipzig)
 Streichquartett D-Moll, Op. 22 (Universal Edition, Wien)
 Streichquartett G-Dur (Ms)
 Klavierquintett G-Moll (Ms)
 Klavierquintett C-Moll, Op. 43
 Chamber Symphony in F, Op. 32 for oboe, clarinet, horn, bassoon and harp (Kahnt, Leipzig)
1. Allegro
2. Andante quasi marcia
3. Allegro
4. Un poco grave ; Allegro
 Violoncellosonate A-Moll, Op. 49 (Doblinger, Vienna)
 Suite für Flote und Streichquartett, Op. 52 (Strache, Wien)
 Trio für 2 Fagotte und Klavier, Op. 53 (Strache, Wien)
 Flute Sonata, Op. 61 (Ortel, Hannover)
 Klavierquartett D--Moll, Op. 63 (Kistner und Siegel, Leipzig)
 "Pocone Overture" mit der amerikanischen Hymne für Klavierquintett D-Moll (Ms)
 Klavierquartett, Op. 75 (1941; Ms)
 Suite für Flöte, Geige Violoncello und Klavier, G-Moll, Op. 76 (1941; Ms)
 Klaviertrio C-Dur (Violine, Violoncello, Klavier), Op. 77 (1942; Ms)
 Spring Suite F-Dur, Op. 80 (2 Flutes, Violin 7 Piano; Ms)
 String Quartet Es-Dur, Op. 86 (1942; Ms)
 Quintet for four recorders and piano, Op. 87 (1942; Ms)
 Three Waltzes for violin and piano, Op. 88 (1942; Ms)
 10 Miniatures for violin and piano, Op. 89 (1943; Ms)
 Six sketches for flute and piano, Op. 90 (1943; Ms)
 String Quartet A Minor, Op. 92 (1943; Ms)
 Piano-Quintet G Minor, Op. 94 (Ms)
 Trio for piano, violin and violoncello, Op. 97 (1943; Ms)
 Trio for Violin. Violoncello and Piano, Op. 100 (Ms)
 Suite for organ and violin, Op 102 (1944; Ms)
 Piano-Quintet D Minor, Op 111b (1945; Ms)
 String Quartet E Minor, Op. 114 (Ms)
 Suite for violin and piano, G Major,  Op. 117a (1946; Ms)
 Suite for violin and piano A Major, Op. 117b (1946; Ms)
 Ten Intermezzi for String Quartet, Op. 124 (1948; Ms
 Three pictures of Vienna for piano and violin, Op. 126a (Ms)
 Ballet-Suite for piano and violin, C Major, Op. 126b (1946; Ms) 
 Trio in D Minor, Op. 127 (1948; Ms)
 Fantasy for trumpet and piano. Comp. for Fr. Lyons (1949; Ms)
 No#  Scherzo G Minor for trumpet and piano, 1949; Ms)
 Sextet for violin, clarinet, French horn, violoncello, two pianos, Op. 133 (1950; Ms)

Piano
 (Two Hand Piano Pieces)
 1  Variationen und Fuge Des-Dur uber em Originalthema (Schlesinger, Berlin.
 4  Sechs Stimmungsbilder (Kahnt, Leipzig.
 9  Variationen in Es-Moll und F-Dur für Klavier (Ms)
 23  Fünf Klavierstucke (Universal Edition, Wien)
 26  Sechs Konzert-Etuden (Siegel (Linnemann), Leipzig.
 41  Bilder aus Natur und Leben (Sechs Klavierstucke) (Doblinger, Vienna)
 No#  Märchen, Stimmungsbild für Klavier (Pabst, Leipzig.
 64  Von den Mädchen (12 ernste u. heitere Charakterskizzen für Klavier) (Universal Edition, Wien)
 70  Drei Klavierstücke, 1940 (Ms)
 71  Letzte Bluten (12 Klavierstücke) 1941 (Ms)
 No#  Waltzes in Schubert style. 1942- Ms.
 85  Vier Klavierstücke. 1942 (Ms)
 98  Zwölf Stücke für Klaviersolo, 1944 (Ms)
 105   Zwölf Stücke für Klaviersolo1944! Ms.
 112  Ballet-Suite for piano and solo! Ms.
 113a. I. Piano Sonata B Minor (Ms)
 113b. II. Piano Sonata A Major! Ms.
 113c. III. Piano Sonata  C Minor! Ms.
 116a.  Suite for Piano D Minor! Ms.
 116b.   Suite for Piano B Minor! Ms.
 116c.   Suite for PianoC Minor, 1946 (Ms)
 No#  Anticipation. (Zu Hedy's 20. Geburtstag.) 1947 (Ms)
 121  12 Klavierstücke, 1948 (Ms)
 128  15 Klavierstücke, 1949 (Ms)
 132a  V. Piano Sonata, A Major (Ms)
 132b.  IV. Piano Suite, E Minor (Ms)

Four-hand piano pieces
 Variationen Es-Moll über ein thema von L. Pahlen un F-Dur über ein thema von M. von Pidoll, Op. 9 (Ms)
 Rondo H-Dur (Ms)
 Suite for Piano, D Minor, Op. 135 (For Barbara Beal) 1950 (Ms)
 Vier Stucke, Op. 74, Op. 99 & 108 (Ms)
 1. Divertimento. Funf Satze (Ms)
 2.  Divertimento D-Dur, Vier Satze (Ms)
 Millington-Suite in E flat, Op. 123 (Ms)

Piano and harmonium
 Fünf Intermezzi, Op. 35 (Leukardt, Leipzig)

Organ
 33   Orgel-Sonate D-Moll (Bohm Sohn, Augsburg.
 24   Kurze Choralvorspiele (Ms)

Lieder
 3  Vier Lieder (4)1 KS-(Robitschek, Wien)
 11  Fünf Lieder (5)! KS-(Robitschek, Wien)
 13  Vier Lieder (4) (KS-(Robitschek, Wien)
 14  Sieben Lieder (7)! KS-(Robitschek, Wien)
 15  Sieben Lieder (7)! KS-(Robitschek, Wien)
 19  Vier Lieder (4)! KS-(Robitschek, Wien)
 20  Fünf Lieder nach Goethe  (KS-(Robitschek, Wien)
 21  Drei Lieder mit obligato Violoncello (3)! Schuberthaus, Wien.
 28  Fünf Lieder (5)! (Universal Edition, Wien)
 47  Vier Lieder nach Natalie von Oldenburg (Kistner und Siegel, Leipzig)
 48  Fünf Lieder (5)! (Universal Edition, Wien)
 54  Fünf Lieder (5)! (Kistner und Siegel, Leipzig)
 55  Zehn Lieder (10)1 (Kistner und Siegel, Leipzig)
 56  Drei Lieder nach H. Dietrolf (Kistner und Siegel, Leipzig)
 no#  Acht Lieder (8)? (Kistner und Siegel, Leipzig)
 60  Zwölf Lieder (12)! Strache, Wien.
 65  Vier Lieder nach Walter Pfund mit obligato Geige (Kistner und Siegel, Leipzig)
 no#  Brautlied für eine Singst., Orgel und Harfe (Kistner und Siegel, Leipzig)
 91 Zwö lf Lieder (12)! MS.
 96  Zehn Lieder (10)! Ms.
 104a  Zehn Lieder (10)! Ms.
 104b  Sechs Lieder nach Janie Rhyne (Ms)
 109  Sechs Lieder (6)! Ms.
 110  Zwölf Lieder (12)! Ms.
 119 Dreizehn (13) Gesange osterreichiscger Dichter (Ms)
 no#  Bergwiese in Vermont nach Raab (Ms)
 no#  Voice of Lake Champlain, song by Charles Ballantyne (Ms)

Duets
 24  Sechs Duette fur Sopran und Alt (Kistner und Siegel, Leipzig)
 34  Sechs Duette fur Sopran und Tenor! Kahnt, Leipzig.

References

External links 
 St. Michael's College Archives
 Biography (in German)
 About Stöhr (in German)
 Short biography in English
 Richard Franz Stöhr at Österreichisches Musiklexiokon online (German)
 

Austrian male composers
Austrian composers
American male composers
American composers
American music educators
1874 births
1967 deaths
Jewish emigrants from Austria to the United States after the Anschluss
University of Music and Performing Arts Vienna alumni
Academic staff of the University of Music and Performing Arts Vienna
Curtis Institute of Music faculty
Saint Michael's College faculty